Petőfibánya (formerly Pernyepuszta, Pernyebánya) is a village in Hungary, Heves county, near Hatvan. It has a population of 2573 (2021).

Geography

Petőfibánya is situated 15 km from Hatvan, in the Mátraalja microregion, among the foothills of the Mátra mountain range. The town was built by the Lőrinci-Rózsaszentmárton highway, not far from the River Zagyva.

History

Petőfibánya is a small planned city established between 1945 and 1965. Originally there was a small settlement on the site called Pernyepuszta. A coal mine was established in 1942 and exploitation of the local lignite reserves began in October 1945. The settlement was renamed to Pernyebánya that year, and Petőfibánya in 1948 (bánya means "mine" in Hungarian).

The mine was operated by the Petőfi Mining Company that built a power plant in nearby Lőrinci. Petőfibánya was part of Lőrinci until 1989 when it became an independent municipality. The mining company also established a mining machine plant in Petőfibánya. Other industrial activities appeared later. The town was given its present name after the state owned company which bore the name of Sándor Petőfi, the national poet of Hungarians.

In the 1950s and 1960s block houses and public buildings were erected in the typical Socialist realist style of the era. Petőfibánya never became an important industrial city because lignite mining halted in the middle of the 1960s. The development of the town came to an abrupt end.

The economic consequences of the 1989 change hit Petőfibánya hard. In the 1990s unemployment was more than 30 percent and many people left the town. Today Petőfibánya is a quiet backwater and a strange "open-air museum" of the 1950s urban planning policies.

References

Populated places in Heves County
Socialist planned cities
Planned cities in Hungary